The chapters of Peach Girl are written and illustrated by Miwa Ueda.

Peach Girl was licensed by Tokyopop for an English-language release in North America. Currently the series is out-of-print.


Volume list

Peach Girl

Peach Girl: Change of Heart

Peach Girl: Sae's Story

References

External links
 

Peach Girl